His/Her Worship the Mayor of Randwick is the head of Randwick City Council, which is the local government area covering the southeastern suburbs of Sydney in the State of New South Wales, Australia. First incorporated on 1 April 1859 as the Municipality of Randwick, under the terms of the Municipalities Act of 1858, the first leaders of the Council were titled "Chairman" until the 1858 act was replaced by the Municipalities Act of 1867, which introduced the title of "Mayor". On 28 June 1973, the council was dismissed and placed under the control of government administrators after an inquiry into the council's handling of Development Applications, finding significant undeclared conflicts-of-interest between councillors and local developments. It remained under administration until 24 September 1977. On 1 July 1993 following the enactment of a new Local Government Act, elected representatives of the council were to be known as "Councillor", replacing the former title of "Alderman".

The Mayor is internally-elected by the Councillors, and nominally serves a two-year term since 2017, which replaced the previous system of annual mayoral elections. The current Mayor of Randwick is Councillor Dylan Parker (Labor), first elected on 30 September 2021. The Mayor is assisted in their work by a Deputy Mayor, who is elected on an annual basis by the elected Councillors.

List of incumbents

Deputy Mayors
The position of Deputy Mayor was made a permanent council position under the Local Government Act 1919. The following individuals have been elected as Deputy Mayor of Randwick:

Notes and references

External links
 The City of Randwick (Council website)

Randwick
Mayors
Mayors Randwick